Pembroke Hall is a historic home located at Edenton, Chowan County, North Carolina. It was built about 1849, and is a two-story, Greek Revival style frame dwelling with a low hip roof. It has a two-story, three bay, frame wing. The front and rear facades feature full-length, three-bay superimposed porticoes.

It was listed on the National Register of Historic Places in 1976.

References

Houses on the National Register of Historic Places in North Carolina
Greek Revival houses in North Carolina
Houses completed in 1849
Houses in Chowan County, North Carolina
National Register of Historic Places in Chowan County, North Carolina
1849 establishments in North Carolina